This list represents accounting firms of Bangladesh. In Bangladesh, there are many accounting firms. People of Bangladesh call accounting firm generally as "CA firm" or "audit firm". Origin of accounting firm in Bangladesh starts from 1972 but it has roots in Pakistan, or even in British period. In that time there were some accountant firm. In present there are many accounting firms in Bangladesh.

List of accounting firms
 Islam Quazi Shafique & Co. (Established in 1998)
 A. Qasem & Co. (Established in 1953, Known as ECOVIS Bangladesh)
 A. Wahab & Co. (Established in 1968)
 ACNABIN Chartered Accountants (Established in 1985)
 G Kibria & co. (Established in 1983)
 Hoda Vasi Chowdhury & Co. (Established in 1963, Successor firm of A. F. Ferguson & Co. and former correspondent firm to Deloitte Touche & Tohmatsu up to 2013)
 Howladar Yunus & Co. (Established in 1970, Known as Grant Thornton Bangladesh)
 Hussain Farhad & Co. (Established in 1997)
 Islam Aftab Kamrul & Co. (Established in 1993)
 KM Hasan & Co. (Established in 1984)
 Kazi Zahir Khan & Co. (Established in 1980)
 Khan Wahab Shafique Rahman & Co. (Established in 1968)
 M.J. Abedin & Co. (Established in 1965)
 M.M. Rahman & Co. (Established in 1958)
 MABS & J Partners (Established in 1979)
 Masih Muhith Haque & Co. (Established in 1985, Known as RSM Bangladesh)
 Nurul Faruk Hasan & Co. (Established in 1989, Known as Deloitte Bangladesh)
 Octokhan Chartered Accountants
 Rahman Mostafa Alam & Co.< (Established in 1986)
 Rahman Rahman Huq (Established in 1962, Known as KPMG Bangladesh)
 S.K. Barua & Co. (Established in 1985)
 S.F. Ahmed & Co. (Established in 1958, Former big4 [EY Bangladesh] now Known as HLB International)
 Toha Khan Zaman & Co. (Established in 1992)
 Zoha Zaman Kabir Rashid & Co. (Established in 1978)
 A. Hogue & Co. (Established in 1986)
 A. Matin & Co. (Establidhed in 1991)
 Ahmed Zaker & Co. (Established in 1979)
 Ahsan Kamal Sadeq & Co.
 Ahsan Manzur & Co. (Established in 1984)
 Anil Salam Idris & Co.
 Anisur Rahman & Co.
 ARTISAN & Co.
 Ashraf Uddin & Co. (Established in 1979)
 Atik Khaled Chowdhury & Co. (Established in 1999)
 Aziz Halim Khair Choudhury & Co. (Established in 1979)
 Basu Banerjee Nath & Co. (Established in 1933)
 Chowdhury Bhattacharjee & Co. (Established in 2000)
 Das Chowdhury Dutta & Co. (Established in 1986)
 FAMES & R.
 Hague Shah Alam Mansur & Co.
 Hogue Bhattacharjee Das & Co. (Ej stablished in 2013)
 Huda Hossain & Co.
 KM Alam & Co. (Established in 1967)
 MA Fazal & Co.
 MI Chowdhury & Co. (Established in 1985)
 MZ Islam & Co. (Established in 1998)
 Mahfel Huq & Co. (Established in 1974)
 Mak & Co. (Established in 2014)
 Malek Siddiqui Wali Chartered Accountants (Established in 1966)
 Mohammad Ata Karim & Co.
 Mollah Quader Yusuf & Co. (Established in 1988)
 Muhammad Shaheedullah & Co.
 Habib Sarwar Bhuiyan & Co. (Established in 1993, Known as Affilica International)
 Pinaki & Company (Established in 1978)
 S.R. Islam & Co. (Established in 1978)
 Rahman Mustafiz Haq & Co. (Established in 1992)
 Shafiq Basak & Co. (Established in 1993)
 Shafiq Mizan Rahman & Augustine
 Shaha & Co. (Established in 1935)
 Shiraz Khan Basak & Co.
 Snehasish Mahmud & Co. (Established in 2013)
 Syful Sharnsul Alam & Co. (Established in 1993)
 M. A. Mallik & Co.
 Howlader Maria & Co.

See also
 The Institute of Chartered Accountants of Bangladesh

References

External links
 

 
accounting,firm